Edward Percival Rishworth (1870 – 28 March 1930) was a New Zealand politician who was Mayor of Lower Hutt from 1918 to 1921.

Biography
Rishworth was a dentist by profession with his own clinic in Lower Hutt. He was interested in education and served for many years on multiple local educational bodies. He was chairman of the Hutt District High School committee, the Hutt Valley's representative on the Wellington Education Board. and chairman of the Hutt Valley High School Board of Governors. He was instrumental in obtaining the land from the Government where Hutt Valley High School was built. He was a member of the Lower Hutt Bowling and Tennis Club and a freemason.

He became Mayor of Lower Hutt in 1918 after the previous mayor, Henry Baldwin, resigned. His first years as mayor were dominated by the Spanish flu epidemic and coordinated the council's response. He was praised for his response and was thus unopposed at the next two mayoral elections. In 1921 Rishworth had a disagreement with the Ratepayers' Association and some councillors over the erection of a gasworks in Lower Hutt as an alternative to using Petone gasworks. The public supported a new gasworks in a plebiscite but the Ratepayers' Association remained opposed it. In December 1921 councillor William Thomas Strand made a speech to the Ratepayers' Association accusing Rishworth of a 'breach of faith' which was later leaked and published in newspapers. At the next council meeting Rishworth addressed the matter and challenged Strand to resign along with himself and contest an election for mayor. Strand accepted the challenge and defeated Rishworth in the by-election.

He died in Lower Hutt on 28 March 1930. He was survived by his wife and family.

References

References

1870 births
1930 deaths
New Zealand dentists
20th-century dentists
New Zealand Freemasons
Mayors of Lower Hutt
Reform Party (New Zealand) politicians
Unsuccessful candidates in the 1919 New Zealand general election